Álvaro Magliano de Morais Filho (born November 27, 1990 in João Pessoa, Paraíba) is a Brazilian male beach volleyball player. Early in his adolescence, Álvaro liked to play soccer. By the influence of his father, who practices beach volleyball, Álvaro began venturing onto the sand and as he says himself: "I have become hooked to beach volleyball". He played with Vitor Felipe from 2007 to the middle of the 2011 season, when he started a partnership with Moisés. Over the years, he also played with Fábio Luiz, Benjamin, Luciano, and Thiago. In March 2013, he started playing with Ricardo Santos, a world-class Olympic Games gold medalist player. This partnership proved outstanding and led Álvaro and Ricardo to finish the FIVB Beach Volleyball World Championship Mazury 2013 in second place. Furthermore, Álvaro also won the prize of Most Valuable Player of the tournament. FIVB said that "... the tournament's Most Valuable Player Alvaro Filho not only performed superbly on the sand, but the statistics also reflected how well he played. The 22-year-old topped the most number of spikes and digs, illustrating how often he was served to while impressing with his backcourt play". In 2019, Álvaro partnered with Olympic champion - Alison Cerutti. The team will be competing in the Tokyo2020 journey.

References

External links
 
 
 
 
 Álvaro Filho at Confederação Brasileira de Voleibol 

1990 births
Living people
Brazilian men's beach volleyball players
Beach volleyball players at the 2015 Pan American Games
Pan American Games silver medalists for Brazil
Pan American Games medalists in volleyball
Medalists at the 2015 Pan American Games
Beach volleyball players at the 2020 Summer Olympics
Sportspeople from Paraíba
21st-century Brazilian people